Motlop is a surname. Notable people with the surname include:

 Daniel Motlop (born 1982), Australian rules footballer
 Marlon Motlop (born 1990), Australian rules footballer
 Shannon Motlop (born 1978), Australian rules footballer
 Steven Motlop (born 1991), Australian rules footballer